Barsha may refer to:

People

Surname
 Afiea Nusrat Barsha (born 1989), Bangladeshi actress
 John Barsha (1898–1976), Russian-born American player of American football
 Leon Barsha (1905–1964), American film producer, editor and director

Given name
 Barsha Rani Bishaya (born 1982), Indian actress
 Barsha Priyadarshini (born 1984), Indian film actress
 Barsha Lekhi (born 1994), Nepalese beauty queen

Other
 Al Barsha, communities in Dubai
 Dubai National School, Al Barsha, school located in Barsha, Dubai
 Barsha Utsab, Monsoon salutation festival
 Deir El Bersha, village in Middle Egypt